Ray Yeung is a screenwriter and independent film director. His films often center on gay stories.

In 2021, he was presented with the Artist of the Year for Film award from the Hong Kong Arts Development Council. Yeung is also the Chairman of the Hong Kong Lesbian and Gay Film Festival, the longest running LGBT film festival in Asia. He revived the festival in 2000.

Early life 
Yeung grew up in Hong Kong. At the age 13, he was sent to an English boarding school outside of London.

Prior to his career in entertainment, Yeung was a lawyer. He graduated from Columbia University School of the Arts in 2013.

Career 
Yeung wrote the plays Banana Skin and The Third Sex. He made several shorts prior to his feature film debut. 

Yeung made his feature film debut with Cut Sleeve Boys, a gay love story between two Chinese-British men, in 2005 at the International Film Festival Rotterdam. The film won Best Feature at the Outfest Fusion Festival in Los Angeles and Best Actor for Chowee Leow at the Madrid Lesbian and Gay Film Festival. 

His second feature film Front Cover premiered at the 2015 Seattle International Film Festival. The story follows Ryan Fu, a gay Chinese American fashion stylist (Jake Choi), who rejects his ethnic heritage, and is assigned to style Ning (James Chen), an ostensibly heterosexual patriotic actor from Beijing. Front Cover won Best Screenplay at the FilmOut San Diego LGBT Film Festival , Jury Award for Best Domestic Feature at the Outflix Film Festival in Memphis and Audience Award at the Boston Asian American Film Festival. 

Yeung had expressed interest in doing a Cantonese-language film set in Hong Kong, having grown up there until age 13. Twilight's Kiss, or Suk Suk, is a film about a gay relationship between two elderly men in Hong Kong and was inspired by the book “Oral Histories of Older Gay Men in Hong Kong” by Hong Kong University Professor Travis S.K. Kong. The film premiered at the Busan International Film Festival in 2019. Suk Suk is his first Chinese-language film. It was awarded Best Film at the 2019 Hong Kong Film Critics Society Award and numerous other awards and nominations from 2019- 2022.

Style and influences 
Yeung cites directors Yasujirō Ozu and Stanley Kwan as his influences.

Filmography

Awards and nominations

References 

Year of birth missing (living people)
Columbia University School of the Arts alumni
Hong Kong film directors
Hong Kong screenwriters
Hong Kong LGBT screenwriters
LGBT film directors
Gay writers
Living people